Osmar Barbosa dos Santos (born October 20, 1968 in Marilia) is a retired Brazilian middle distance runner who competed mostly over 800 metres. He started competing internationally around year 1996 and won a bronze medal at the 2004 World Indoor Championships.

Competition record

Personal bests
400 metres - 46.35 (1995)
800 metres - 1:44.87 (2000)

External links

1968 births
Living people
Brazilian male middle-distance runners
Athletes (track and field) at the 1996 Summer Olympics
Athletes (track and field) at the 2000 Summer Olympics
Athletes (track and field) at the 2004 Summer Olympics
Olympic athletes of Brazil
Pan American Games athletes for Brazil
Athletes (track and field) at the 2003 Pan American Games
Pan American Games medalists in athletics (track and field)
Pan American Games silver medalists for Brazil
Medalists at the 2003 Pan American Games
21st-century Brazilian people